Durham County is a county located in the U.S. state of North Carolina. As of the 2020 census, the population was 324,833, making it the sixth-most populous county in North Carolina. Its county seat is Durham, which is the only incorporated municipality predominantly in the county, though very small portions of cities and towns mostly in neighboring counties also extend into Durham County.  The central and southern parts of Durham County are highly urban, consisting of the city as well as several unincorporated suburbs.  Southeastern Durham County is dominated by the Research Triangle Park, most of which is in Durham County.  The northern third of Durham County is rural in nature.

Durham County is the core of the Durham-Chapel Hill, NC Metropolitan Statistical Area, which is also included in the Raleigh-Durham-Cary, NC Combined Statistical Area, which had a population of 2,106,463 in 2020.

History

The county was formed on April 17, 1881, from parts of Orange County and Wake County, taking the name of its own county seat.  In 1911, parts of Cedar Fork Township of Wake County were transferred to Durham County and became Carr Township.

Geography

State and local protected areas/sites 
 Bennett Place State Historic Site
 Duke Homestead and Tobacco Factory
 East Durham Historic District
 Eno River State Park (part)
 Falls Lake State Recreation Area (part)
 Historic Stagville
 Hollow Rock Nature Park (part)
 Horton Grove Nature Preserve
 Little River Regional Park and Natural Area (part)
 Mason Farm Biological Reserve (part)
 Rolling View State Recreation Area (part)

Major water bodies 
 Crabtree Creek (Neuse River tributary)
 Ellerbe Creek
 Eno River
 Falls Lake
 Flat River
 Jordan Lake
 Lake Michie
 Little River (Eno River tributary)
 New Hope Creek
 Stirrup Iron Creek

Adjacent counties
 Person County - north
 Granville County - northeast
 Wake County - east-southeast
 Chatham County - south
 Orange County - west

Major highways

 
 
 
 
 
 
 
  (Durham)
  (To Orange County)
 
 
 
 
 
 
 
  (Truck Route)

Major infrastructure 

 Durham Station

Demographics

2020 census

As of the 2020 United States census, there were 324,833 people, 131,140 households, and 75,291 families residing in the county.

2000 census
As of the census of 2000, there were 223,314 people, 89,015 households, and 54,032 families residing in the county.  The population density was 769 people per square mile (297/km2).  There were 95,452 housing units at an average density of 329 per square mile (127/km2).  The racial makeup of the county was  50.91% White, 39.46% Black or African American, 0.30% Native American, 3.29% Asian, 0.04% Pacific Islander, 4.21% from other races, and 1.80% from two or more races.  7.63% of the population were Hispanic or Latino of any race.

There were 89,015 households, out of which 29.10% had children under the age of 18 living with them, 42.00% were married couples living together, 14.80% had a female householder with no husband present, and 39.30% were non-families. 30.00% of all households were made up of individuals, and 7.00% had someone living alone who was 65 years of age or older.  The average household size was 2.40 and the average family size was 2.99.

In the county, the age distribution was as follows: 22.90% under the age of 18, 12.80% from 18 to 24, 34.80% from 25 to 44, 19.80% from 45 to 64, and 9.70% who were 65 years of age or older.  The median age was 32 years. For every 100 females there were 93.00 males.  For every 100 females age 18 and over, there were 89.70 males.

The median income for a household in the county was $43,337, and the median income for a family was $53,223. Males had a median income of $35,939 versus $30,683 for females. The per capita income for the county was $23,156.  About 9.80% of families and 13.40% of the population were below the poverty line, including 17.20% of those under age 18 and 12.30% of those age 65 or over.

Law and government

Durham County is a member of the regional Triangle J Council of Governments. Durham County is governed by a five-member board of county commissioners, currently consisting of Chair Brenda A. Howerton, Vice Chair Wendy Jacobs, Nimasheena Burns, Heidi Carter, and Nida Allam. All are elected concurrently, and each elected member serves a four-year term. The current Sheriff, Clarence Birkhead, was elected in 2018 and is the County's first African American Sheriff to hold office.

Politics
Durham County is consistently one of the most Democratic counties in North Carolina, having only voted for the Republican candidate twice since 1884, the Republican landslides of 1928 and 1972. George H. W. Bush is the last Republican to manage even 40 percent of the county's vote. Since the 1990s, Durham County has been one of the most Democratic urban counties in the South.

Communities

The city of Durham is the only incorporated municipality to predominantly exist within Durham County, and the only one whose urban core lies within the county, though small portions of municipalities from neighboring counties extend into Durham County, and the city of Durham also itself extends slightly into neighboring counties.  All other towns and places within Durham County are unincorporated communities.

Cities
 Durham (county seat and largest city, Small portions extend into Wake and Orange counties)
 Raleigh (small part, mostly in Wake County)

Towns
 Chapel Hill (small part, mostly in Orange County)
 Morrisville (small part, mostly in Wake County)

Townships
 Carr
 Durham
 Lebanon
 Mangum
 Oak Grove
 Triangle

Census-designated places
 Gorman
 Rougemont (small portions extend into neighboring Person County)

Unincorporated communities
 Bahama
 Bethesda
 Genlee
 Lowe's Grove
 Nelson
 Oak Grove
 Braggtown

Notable people
 

Margaret O'Neal (1884-?), sharecropper

See also
 List of counties in North Carolina
 National Register of Historic Places listings in Durham County, North Carolina
 North Carolina State Parks
 Bull Durham, 1988 romantic comedy about the Durham Bulls.
 Research Triangle Park, largest Research park in the United States.

References

External links

 
 
 Greater Durham Chamber of Commerce
 Durham County Library website
 North Carolina Room of the Durham County Library - website for an archive which collects materials concerning the city and county of Durham

 
1881 establishments in North Carolina
Populated places established in 1881
Majority-minority counties in North Carolina